is a Japanese cement company. It was formed in 1998 with the merger of Chichibu Onoda (itself a merger of Chichibu Cement and Onoda Cement) and Nihon Cement (formerly Asano Cement).

Business segments and products
The company is organized into the following business segments and products:
 Cement business
 Cement
 Ready-mixed concrete
 Soil stabilizers
 Mineral resources business
 Mined aggregates
 Limestone products
 Environmental business
 Recycling of waste materials: used tires, waste plastics, paper sludge, waste casting sand, surplus soil from water purification, sewage sludge and dredging sludge
 Environmental recycling technologies
 Construction of waste treatment plants
 Construction materials business
 Concrete products required for construction sites
 Ceramics & electronics business
 Ceramic products and electronic products used in semiconductor and LCD manufacturing
 Real estate business
 Lease of land for office buildings, commercial stores, leisure facilities and distribution warehouses

In the U.S., the Federal Mine Safety and Health Administration's Data Retrieval System (DRS) shows Taiheiyo Cement Corp. controlling 29 facilities and mines under the jurisdiction of the Mine Safety and Health Administration.

References

External links

 Taiheiyo Cement 

Manufacturing companies based in Tokyo
Japanese brands
Companies listed on the Tokyo Stock Exchange
Companies listed on the Fukuoka Stock Exchange
Japanese companies established in 1881
Fuyo Group
Mitsui
Cement companies of Japan